The West Okement is a river in north Dartmoor in Devon in south-west England. It rises at West Okement Head near Cranmere Pool and flows in a generally NW direction past Black-a-Tor Copse and into Meldon Reservoir. After exiting the reservoir it flows in a generally northeast direction towards Okehampton, where it joins the East Okement River to form the River Okement.

Okement
Okement
2WestOkement